Roomrama is the de facto national anthem of the Assyrian people. It was composed by Nebu Juel Issabey and written by Yosip Bet Yosip for the Assyrian Universal Alliance and the Assyrian independence movement. 

Other de facto, or unofficial, national anthem include, Salma d'Shoobakhan.

Lyrics
ܩܵܐ ܪܘܼܡܪܵܡܵܐ ܕܫܸܡܵܐ ܪܵܡܵܐ
ܕܐܘܼܡܬܲܢ ܐܵܬܘܿܪ ܟܵܠܲܚ ܒܫܠܵܡܵܐ
ܗ̇ܝ ܕܗ݇ܘܹܐ ܠܵܗ̇ ܕܲܪܓܘܼܫܬܵܐ ܕܡܲܪܕܘܼܬܵܐ
ܩܵܐ ܐܝܼܩܵܪܵܐ ܕܐܲܒ݂ܵܗܵܬܲܢ
ܐܵܢܝܼ ܕܦܪܝܼܣ ܠܗܘܿܢ ܠܡܸܬ ܥܲܡܪܵܢܝܼܬܵܐ
ܐܵܢܝܼ ܕܡܗܘܼܕܝܵܐ ܠܗܘܿܢ ܐܵܗ ܒܲܪܢܵܫܘܼܬܵܐ
ܕܥܵܡܪܵܐ ܗ݇ܘܵܐ ܒܫܠܵܡܵܐ ܗܲܠ ܐܵܒܵܕܘܼܬܵܐ
ܕܚܲܝ̈ܘܿܗ̇ ܥܵܒ݂ܪܝܼ ܗ݇ܘܵܘ ܒܪܘܵܚܲܢܝܘܼܬܵܐ
ܕܝܵܪܡܵܐ ܗ݇ܘܵܐ ܒܡܵܪܝܵܐ ܓܵܘ ܥܸܠܵܝܘܼܬܵܐ

Transliteration
Qa Roomrama D-Shima Rama
D-Umtan Atoor Kalakh B-Shlama
Ay D-Weela Dargooshta D-Mardoota
Qa Eeqara D-Awahatan
Aney D-prisloon L-Mitamranita
Aney D-Mhoodyaloon Ah Barnashoota
D-Amrawa B-Shlama Hal Abadoota
D-Khayo Oree'wa B-Rwakhaniyoota
D-Yarmawa B-Marya Go Elayoota

English Translation
For the honor and advancement 
Of our great nation Assyria
That was the cradle of civilization, 
For the honor of our forefathers
Who spread across the globe
And guided nations,
To exist in peace forever
Live with wealth and abundance
And achieve greatness in God.

External links
 MIDI of Assyrian National Anthem

References

National anthems
Asian anthems
Assyrian music